The Men's 100 metres at the 2011 All-Africa Games took place on 11–12 September at the Estádio Nacional do Zimpeto.

The final held at 7:10 p.m. local time.

Medalists

Records 
Prior to this competition, the existing World, African record and World leading were as follows:

Schedule

Results

Heats
Qualification: First 3 in each heat (Q) and the next 3 fastest (q) advance to the semifinals.

Wind:Heat 1: +0.4 m/s, Heat 2: -0.6 m/s, Heat 3: +2.6 m/s, Heat 4: −0.8 m/s, Heat 5: −0.2 m/s, Heat 6: +0.3 m/s

Semifinals
Qualification: First 2 in each heat (Q) and the next 2 fastest (q) advance to the Final.

Wind:Heat 1: +1.8 m/s, Heat 2: +2.0 m/s, Heat 3: +3.2 m/s

Final
Wind: −0.4 m/s

References

External links
100 metres results at AfricaAthle.com

100 meters men
2011